Special Generation may refer to:

 Special Generation (band), an American vocal quintet
 "Special Generation" (song), by the Japanese girl idol group Berryz Kobo